Camp Concentration is a 1968 science fiction novel by American author Thomas M. Disch. After being serialized in New Worlds in 1967, it was published by Hart-Davis in the UK in 1968 and by Doubleday in the US in 1969. Translations have been published in Dutch, French, German, Spanish, Italian, Serbian and Polish. 
 
The book is set during a war, projected from the Vietnam War, in which the United States is apparently criminally involved (it is noted at one point that the US is waging germ warfare in "the so-called neutral countries"). The President of the United States during this fictional war is Robert McNamara.

Plot summary
In Part I, poet, lapsed Catholic and conscientious objector Louis Sacchetti  is sent to a secret military installation called Camp Archimedes, where military prisoners are injected with a form of syphilis intended to make them geniuses (hence the punning reference to "concentration" in the novel's title). By breaking down rigid categories in the mind (according to a definition of genius put forward by Arthur Koestler), the disease makes the thought process both faster and more flexible; it also causes physical breakdown and, within nine months, death.

The book is told in the form of Sacchetti's diary, and includes literary references to the story of Faust (at one point the prisoners stage Christopher Marlowe's Doctor Faustus and Sacchetti's friendship with ringleader Mordecai Washington parallels Faust's with Mephistopheles).  It only becomes clear that Sacchetti himself has syphilis as his diary entries refer to his increasingly poor health, and become progressively more florid, until almost descending into insanity.

In Part II, after a test run on the prisoners, a megalomaniac nuclear physicist has himself injected with the disease, joins Camp Archimedes with his team of student helpers, and sets about trying to end the human race.

The prisoners in the book appear to be fascinated by alchemy, which they used as an elaborate cover for their escape plans. Sacchetti, who is obese, has a number of ironic visions involving other obese historical and intellectual figures, such as Thomas Aquinas.

Allusions and sources
The book is seen as an example of New Wave modernism. In addition to the staging of Marlowe's play, the book alludes to Thomas Mann's novel Doctor Faustus, which is about a composer named Adrian Leverkühn who intentionally contracts syphilis.
Disch's book mentions a female composer named Adrienne Leverkuhn.

References

External links
 

1967 American novels
Dystopian novels
1967 science fiction novels
Novels by Thomas M. Disch
Rupert Hart-Davis books